Lower King is a town in the Great Southern region of Western Australia.

Located along the lower reaches of the King River on the western shore of Oyster Harbour, both the town and the river were named after Captain Philip Parker King, who first visited the area in 1818 aboard Mermaid.

The area around Lower King was a known haunt for sealers in 1831; it was settled in the 1830s with the townsite not being gazetted until 1959.

It had a population of 1604 in 2006, which increased to 1738 in 2011.

References 

Towns in Western Australia
Great Southern (Western Australia)